Flavored condoms are specialized condom products that have a flavor-coating and that are specially designed for an oral intercourse exclusively, and not for penetrative acts. Originally flavored condoms used to be more of a charmed novelty item, rather than for actual protection. However, now there are FDA approved flavored condoms on the market. Diseases can be transmitted via oral sex, that is why condom usage is recommended, and flavored condoms are especially suited for that purpose, because regular condoms have unpleasant taste of latex. Some flavored condoms also have a flavor-specific scent added to them.

Risks

Irritations and infections
Some concerns of using flavored condoms in vaginal penetration exist, since flavored condoms have some amounts of sugar on them, and inserting sugar to vagina can end up resulting in candidal vulvovaginitis or bacterial vaginosis.

Allergies
People with latex allergy should avoid using flavored latex-material condoms, and instead use polyurethane or polyisoprene condoms.

See also
Different types of flavor-focused products may include:
Flavored tobacco
Flavored milk
Flavored salt
Flavored liquor

References

Condoms